The Museum of Jewish Culture is a museum in Bratislava, Slovakia, which focuses on the history of the Jews in Slovakia.

History 
The Museum of Jewish Culture began to take shape on the grounds of the SNM Historical Museum as the Department of Jewish Culture. It became an independent SNM museum with nationwide operation in 1994.

Expositions 

 Exposition of Jewish culture in Slovakia in the premises of the Zsigray Curia at Židovská 17 in Bratislava.
 Barkány's permanent collection of Judaica in the Prešov Synagogue.
 Synagogue in Nitra. In the women's gallery, the exhibition is dedicated to the fate of Jews in Slovakia.
 The Sereď Holocaust Museum (opened January 26, 2016) is located in the authentic premises of the former Sereď Labor and Concentration Camp.

References

External links
, official website

1993 establishments in Slovakia
Museums established in 1993
Museums in Bratislava
Jewish Slovak history
Jewish museums
Jews and Judaism in Bratislava